Bernd Jäkel (born 1 May 1954) is a German sailor and Olympic champion. 
He competed in the Soling class together with Jochen Schümann and Thomas Flach at the 1988 Summer Olympics in Seoul, where they won the gold medal. The same crew participated at the 1996 Summer Olympics in Atlanta, where they also received a gold medal.

References

External links
 
 
 

1954 births
Living people
German male sailors (sport)
Sailors at the 1980 Summer Olympics – Star
Sailors at the 1988 Summer Olympics – Soling
Sailors at the 1992 Summer Olympics – Soling
Sailors at the 1996 Summer Olympics – Soling
Olympic sailors of East Germany
Olympic sailors of Germany
Olympic gold medalists for East Germany
Olympic gold medalists for Germany
Olympic medalists in sailing
Medalists at the 1996 Summer Olympics
Medalists at the 1988 Summer Olympics
European Champions Soling
Soling class world champions